The phrase Smart Water may refer to:

 SmartWater, a crime deterrent system
 Smartwater, a drink by Energy Brands
 Smart fluid, a unique liquid whose properties may be changed under magnetic pressure